William Allen Horncastle (21 September 1864 – 26 January 1917) was an English first-class cricketer active 1883 who played for Middlesex. He was born in Tottenham; died in Leyton.

References

1864 births
1917 deaths
English cricketers
Middlesex cricketers